Taff Vale may refer to:

 The valley of the River Taff in South Wales surrounded by the communities of Ynysybwl|Ynysybwl & Coed-y-Cwm, Pontypridd and Taffs Well
Taff Vale Railway, a Welsh railway line
Taff Vale Railway Co. v. Amalgamated Society of Railway Servants, a 1901 court case